National Lampoon's Movie Madness is a 1982 American comedy film produced by National Lampoon as the second film from the magazine. The film was originally produced under the title National Lampoon Goes to the Movies; completed in 1981, the film was not released until 1982, and was reedited and retitled as Movie Madness.

Movie Madness consists of three short segments which satirize personal growth films, glossy soap operas, and police stories. The first two segments of the film, Growing Yourself and Success Wanters, were directed by Bob Giraldi, while the film's final segment, Municipalians, was directed by Henry Jaglom, and featuring Julie Kavner's first film appearance. Its title song, "Going to the Movies", was sung by Dr. John. The film was a critical and commercial failure.

Cast

Growing Yourself
Growing Yourself has a confused family man (Peter Riegert) who throws his wife (Candy Clark) out of the house in order for him to "grow" a new path in life and raise his four children on his own.
 Peter Riegert as Jason Cooper
 Diane Lane as Liza
 Candy Clark as Susan Cooper
 Teresa Ganzel as Diana
 Schnootie Neff as Jennifer Cooper
 Andy Shakman as Josh Cooper
 Tamar Howard as Judy Cooper
 Ina Fried as Jeffrey Cooper
 Trinidad Silva as Carlos
 John Lawlor as Mr. Haggis
 Nedra Volz as Old Lady

Success Wanters
In Success Wanters, Dominique Corsaire (Ann Dusenberry) is a young college graduate determined to succeed in life, who in a few days time lands a job as a stripper, then becomes the mistress to the owner of a margarine company which she inherits when he croaks, and is then romanced by a Greek shipping tycoon, and ultimately the US president (Fred Willard).
 Ann Dusenberry as Dominique Corsaire
 Robert Culp as Paul Everest
 Titos Vandis as Nixos Naxos
 Bobby Di Cicco as Nicholas Naxos
 Margaret Whitton as First Lady Lousille Fogerty
 Fred Willard as President Robert Fogerty
 Olympia Dukakis as Helena Naxos
 Mary Woronov as Joyce, The Secretary 
 Dick Miller as Dr. Hans Kleiner

Municipalians
Municipalians includes a naive rookie Los Angeles policeman (Robby Benson) paired with a cynical veteran (Richard Widmark) of the force to catch an inept serial killer (Christopher Lloyd).
 Robby Benson as Officer Brent Falcone
 Richard Widmark as Stan Nagurski
 Christopher Lloyd as Samuel Starkman
 Barry Diamond as Junkie
 Julie Kavner as Mrs. Falcone (in her first film appearance)
 Elisha Cook as "Mousy"
 Rockne Tarkington as Black Cop

Production 
National Lampoon Goes to the Movies was the second film produced by the magazine National Lampoon, after Animal House. National Lampoon Goes to the Movies was conceived as a parody of ten film and television genres. In A Futile and Stupid Gesture, Josh Karp described the project as "a cocaine-fueled fiasco; nobody had a sense of structure or any idea how to write a screenplay." Eventually, the screenplay was trimmed down to four segments: a "divorce movie", a "making-it-big movie", a "cop movie" and a "terrorist movie". Writer Shary Flenniken said of the project, "We cut stuff and boiled it down. It lost its purpose and just became a bunch of crazy crap."

During the filming of "Success Wanters", Bob Giraldi required an "opulent, yet tasty enough bedroom"; Muhammad Ali provided his own for the shoot, and Giraldi also filmed another scene in Ali's dining room. Ali received the standard location fee for the use of his rooms and props.

Release 

Flenniken states that a test screening of the film in Rhode Island was met with extremely negative response, and that audience members tore up the seats in the theater to express their dislike of the film. The film was completed in 1981, but not released until two years later.

A fourth segment intended for the film was entirely removed. A disaster movie parody directed by Jaglom, the segment was entitled The Bomb, and starred Kenneth Mars, Allen Garfield, and Marcia Strassman. Steven Bach, United Artists' vice president of production at the time, later wrote that the film's "high commercial promise was dashed when its two directors delivered three good, funny segments and a fourth that rendered the other three pointless because it was of an awfulness that made the whole picture--too short with merely three sections--look unreleasable." Nonetheless, images from the segment appeared in press materials, despite not appearing in the final film.

Reception

This film holds a 0% rating on Rotten Tomatoes, from five reviews. Producer Matty Simmons later said, "Scenes between Peter and Diane in Movie Madness are possibly worth the price of admission but the rest of the movie didn't come off as well."

Soundtrack
There was never an official soundtrack released, but four songs are known for appearing in the film.
"Going to the Movies" by Dr. John
"Growing Yourself" by Don McLean
"You Don't Love Me"
"Feelings" by New Orleans Nighthawks

References

External links
 
 

1983 films
1980s English-language films
1983 comedy films
American comedy films
Metro-Goldwyn-Mayer films
United Artists films
Movie Madness
Films directed by Henry Jaglom
Films directed by Bob Giraldi
1980s American films